Dikélame (English: Look at me) is the debut album by Spanish Romani singer Jorge González, released in the summer of 2007 by Vale Music. Dikélame, Romani language album name. Its lead single “Xikilla baila.” In Spain, the album entered and peaked at number thirtyone on the Spanish Albums Chart, staying on the chart for a total of 10 weeks.

Track listing 
 Xikilla baila	
 Cada día más loco	
 Hola mi amor	
 Dame veneno	
 Todos me lo dicen	
 Anda que no	
 Mírame	
 Donde esté tu corazón	
 Bailar contigo	
 Ya es tarde	
 Lunas de miel	
 Quiero más y más

Charts

Credits 
 Josep Lladóp — roducer, mixing, programming, piano, keyboards
 Sergi Riera — mixing
 Joan Campanera — assistant engineer
 Mauricio Tonelli — mastering
 Toni Mateos — drums
 Jordi Vericat — bass
 Toto Montoya  — percussion, drawer
 Xavier Figuerola — saxophone soprano
 Carles Torregrosa — backing vocals
 Luis Sánchez — backing vocals
 Carlos Muñoz — programming, piano, keyboards
 David Palau — electric guitar
 Jason Heidelmann — electric guitar
 Jordi Bonell — Spanish guitar
 Pedro Javier González — Spanish guitar
 Aurora Salazar — backing vocals
 Lidia Guevara — backing vocals

References
external links
 Album Dikélame by Jorge González, credits.
References

2007 debut albums
Spanish-language albums
Vale Music albums